

The Indraéro Aéro 101 was a light training biplane developed in France in the 1950s.

Design and service

It was a conventional design with single-bay staggered wings braced with an I-strut, and fixed tailskid undercarriage with divided main units. The pilot and instructor sat in tandem, open cockpits.  A small batch of  aircraft were ordered by SALS for aeroclub use.

The prototype, known as the Aéro 110, differing from the later production Aero 101s by having a welded steel tube fuselage and a  Salmson 9ADb radial engine, first flew on 1 May 1950

Operational history
Three examples of the type were current on the French Civil Aircraft Register in 2009, including an Aero 101C and two Aero 101s.

Variants
Aéro 110Prototype of the Aero 101 with welded steel tube fuselage and Salmson 9ADb radial engine first flown on 1 May 1950, 1 built.
Aéro 101 Ten production aircraft built with wooden structure and powered by Minié 4.DC.32 engines, first flown on 27 July 1951.
Aéro 101C  At least one aircraft fitted with a  Continental A65.

Specifications (Aéro 101)

References

Bibliography

External links

Aero 110

1950s French civil trainer aircraft
Indraéro aircraft
Biplanes
Single-engined tractor aircraft
Aircraft first flown in 1951